The Church of St Michael and All Angels, Orton Road, Lawton Moor, Northenden, Manchester, is an Anglican church of 1935-7 by N. F.Cachemaille-Day.  Pevsner describes the church as "sensational for its country and its time".  The church has been listed Grade II* on the National Heritage List for England since 16 January 1981.

The Corporation of Manchester acquired the Wythenshawe Estate in 1926 and began laying out the garden suburb in 1930.  Covering , it was eventually to have 25,000 houses and a population of 100,000. The garden suburb was designated part of the parish of Church of St Wilfrid, Northenden but that small parish church proved insufficient to accommodate the rising congregation.  A mission church was therefore opened in 1934, and in 1935 the diocese approved plans for the construction of a new parish church at Orton Road.  The budget was £10,000.  Nugent Francis Cachemaille-Day was appointed as architect for both the church and the adjoining parsonage. The foundation stone for the church was laid on 8 May 1937, by the Bishop of Manchester. The builder was J. Clayton and Sons of Denton.

The plan of the church is a star, comprising two inter-locked squares.  It is built of "red brick in English bond with some stone dressings".  The roof is flat with a cross in the centre.

The interior is "raw but spatially subtle".  It has an "ingenious plan with lofty columns supporting [a] flat ribbed roof".  The plans show the long-held tradition that Cachemaille-Day intended to place the altar in the centre of the building is not correct.

Michael Barber, FRS (1934 – 1991) was a chemist and mass spectrometrist who became the church organist.

See also

Grade II* listed buildings in Greater Manchester
Listed buildings in Manchester-M23

References

Sources

External links

20th-century Church of England church buildings
Church of England church buildings in Greater Manchester
Churches completed in 1937
Grade II* listed churches in Manchester
Nugent Cachemaille-Day buildings
Christian organizations established in 1934